The Tupamaros – National Liberation Movement (MLN-T), widely known as Tupamaros, was a Marxist-Leninist urban guerrilla group in Uruguay in the 1960s and 1970s. The MLN-T is inextricably linked to its most important leader, Raúl Sendic, and his brand of social politics. José Mujica, who later became President of Uruguay, was also a member. 300 Tupamaros died either in action or in prisons (mostly in 1972), according to officials of the group. About 3,000 Tupamaros were also imprisoned.

Origins of the Tupamaros
For most of the 1900s, Uruguay was one of the most flourishing nations in Latin America. President José Batlle y Ordóñez raised Uruguay's living standard to nearly match that of European industrialized nations by creating a complex social welfare system, after the civil war that preceded his presidency. During both world wars, Uruguay was considered the "Switzerland of the Americas" as it made the majority of its profits through exporting agricultural goods. After World War II, food prices decreased in Europe and Asia, causing exports from Uruguay to decrease and resulting in lower wages for unionized workers, fewer social services, and increased national tension. The Tupamaros formed in this time of instability, as a youthful group of students and professionals. They attracted trade union members, students, and people of poor socioeconomic status from rural areas.

Activity
 
The Tupamaro movement was named after the revolutionary Túpac Amaru II, who in 1780 led a major indigenous revolt against the Viceroyalty of Peru. Its origins lie in the union between the Movimiento de Apoyo al Campesino (Peasant Support Movement), members of trade unions founded by Sendic in poverty-stricken rural zones, and radicalized cells of the Socialist Party of Uruguay.

The movement began by staging the robbing of banks, gun clubs and other businesses in the early 1960s, then distributing stolen food and money among the poor in Montevideo. It took as its slogan, "Words divide us; action unites us."

Later on as the Tupamaros grew, they helped develop the 'Frente Amplio' political coalition, serving as the counterpart to their underground organization. The Frente Amplio combined leftist and centre-left views.

At the beginning, it abstained from armed actions and violence, acting not as a guerrilla group but a political movement. In June 1968, President Jorge Pacheco, trying to suppress labour unrest, enforced a state of emergency and repealed all constitutional safeguards. The government imprisoned political dissidents, used torture during interrogations, and brutally repressed demonstrations. In 1969 they occupied the city of Pando. The Tupamaro movement engaged then in political kidnappings, "armed propaganda" and assassinations. Of particular note are the kidnapping of powerful bank manager  and of the British ambassador to Uruguay, Geoffrey Jackson, as well as the assassination of Dan Mitrione, a U.S. FBI agent that was also working for the CIA (via the Agency for International Development's Office of Public Safety), who the Tupamaros learned was advising the Uruguayan police in torture and other security work.

The Tupamaros peaked as a guerrilla group in 1970 and 1971. During this period they made liberal use of their Cárcel del Pueblo (or People's Prison) where they held those that they kidnapped and interrogated them, before making the results of these interviews public. A number of these hostages were later ransomed for considerable sums of money, including the Brazilian Consul in Montevideo, . In September 1971 over 100 imprisoned Tupamaros escaped the Punta Carretas prison by digging a hole across their cells and then a tunnel that led from the floor of one ground-level cell to the living room of a nearby home. As a result of this, the government summoned the military to prepare a counter-insurgency campaign to suppress the MLN.

Nonetheless, in 1972 the group was quickly crippled by a series of events. First, it had started to engage in political violence since 1970, a choice that weakened its popular support. Second, the group responded to the assassination and/or disappearance of four Tupamaros on the part of illegal parapolice squads with a wave of high-profile assassinations that concentrated political opposition against them. Later on, the MLN directly attacked the military and killed a number of soldiers. The army's response was swift; it included the heavy use of torture and the flipping of high-ranking Tupamaros, including Héctor Amodio Pérez, towards collaborating with them.

The Tupamaros collapsed in mid-1972, with the army killing many of them and capturing a majority of the rest. Shortly after defeating the MLN the military successively confronted the independence of the judiciary in October 1972, of the civilian executive branch in February 1973, and lastly the independence of the parliament in June 1973. On this latter occasion, it completed its coup d'état by deploying armored vehicles in the capital and shutting down the legislative branch by request of the Uruguayan President. Nine Tupamaros were specially chosen to remain in squalid conditions, including Sendic, Fernández Huidobro, José Mujica, Henry Engler, and Mauricio Rosencof. They remained there until the restoration of liberal democracy in Uruguay in 1985. During the intervening years, the military regime killed and "disappeared" additional numbers of people, focusing particularly on the Communist Party of Uruguay.

The dictatorship in Uruguay ended in 1984 when democratic elections were held. Under Julio María Sanguinetti, the new president, amnesty was granted to the Tupamaros. The Tupamaros were released from prison after over a decade and they joined together in representing the Frente Amplio coalition party. In 2004, Tabaré Vásquez was the first to become president on the "Frente Amplio" ticket. The ceramicist and former member, Eva Díaz Torres, returned to Uruguay during this period.

List of attacks

8 October 1969 – taking of Pando.
31 July 1970 – kidnapping of U.S. government official, Dan Mitrione, who trained Uruguayan police in the use of torture. He was murdered on 10 August.
31 July 1970 – kidnapping of the Brazilian consul Aloysio Dias Gomide, released on 21 February 1971 for ransom ($250,000).
7 August 1970 – the kidnapping of U.S. agronomist Dr. Claude Fly, released on 2 March 1971 after a health crisis following a heart attack inside the People's Prison.
29 September 1970 – bombing of the Carrasco Bowling Club, gravely injuring the elderly caretaker Hilaria Ibarra (rescued from the rubble by Gustavo Zerbino who would later be a survivor of the Andes disaster).
8 January 1971 – the kidnapping of the British ambassador Geoffrey Jackson.
21 December 1971 – killing of rural laborer Pascasio Báez by sodium pentothal injection.
18 May 1972 – four Uruguayan Army soldiers killed by machine gun fire while watching over the house of the commander-in-chief of the Army, General Florencio Gravina.

Notable members 

 The Uruguayan "nine hostages" kept under arrest between 1972–85:
 Raúl Sendic – Founder and leader of the group. Famous for his self-effacing, timid nature.
 Eleuterio Fernández Huidobro – Became a prominent politician beginning in the mid-1990s. Ministry of National Defense in 2011 until his death. On August 5, 2016, he died in office at the age of 74.
 José Mujica – Inaugurated as president of Uruguay in March 2010.
 Mauricio Rosencof – Became a prominent writer and playwright after leaving prison. Director of Culture of The Municipality of Montevideo in 2005.
 Henry Engler – Left for Sweden post-prison and became a prominent medical researcher.
 Adolfo Wasem – Died of cancer before liberation.
 Jorge Zabalza – The youngest of the "nine hostages". Famous in Uruguay for his continued radical militancy well into the present day. 
 Julio Marenales
 Jorge Manera
 Héctor Amodio Pérez – The only prominent and founding member of the Tupamaros who organized the escape from Punta Carretas prison. He fled to Spain in 1973 and only resurfaced in the public eye in 2013.

References

External links
Tupamaros (Official Site)
Attacks attributed to the Tupamaros on the START database
The Tupamaros of Uruguay
 Tupamaros Tunnel Out. Time 1971.
Far-left politics in Uruguay
Defunct communist militant groups
Guerrilla organizations
Guerrilla movements in Latin America
History of Uruguay
Leninist organizations
Marxist organizations
 
1967 establishments in Uruguay